Dalian Naval Academy is one of the higher education institutes of the Chinese People's Liberation Army Navy and is located in Dalian, Liaoning.

It was established in 1949 as the first naval academy of the Chinese People's Liberation Army and was changed to the current name in 1986.

Its address is 667, Jiefang Road, Zhongshan District, Dalian, and is just north of Laohutan, a popular resort place that houses the Dalian Laohutan Ocean Park.

Zhang Zhannan, Wu Shengli and others are in the list of the former heads of this academy.

See also
 Chinese People's Liberation Army Navy

External links
 Dalian Naval Academy (Chinese Forces Net) 
 Visiting Dalian Naval Academy (China Net)  with a picture of the entrance gate
 Turkish Naval Academy Delegation Visited Dalian Naval Academy in May '10 (Turkish Naval Academy Student Magazine: Pusula)  (in Turkish)

Universities and colleges in Dalian
Military academies of China
People's Liberation Army Navy
Naval academies